8HP (8-speed transmission with hydraulic converter and planetary gearsets) is ZF Friedrichshafen AG's trademark name for its 8-speed automatic transmission models for longitudinal engine applications, designed and built by ZF's subsidiary in Saarbrücken, Germany. It had its debut in the BMW 7 Series (F01) 760Li saloon fitted with the V12 engine, and since then each new BMW model in all Series down to the 1 Series in rear-wheel-drive and all-wheel-drive versions have had the option to be equipped with it.

One of its main aims is to improve vehicle fuel economy, and it can achieve an 11% saving compared to the ZF 6HP transmission and 14% versus modern 5-speed transmissions. Due to changes in internal design, the shift times have reduced to 200 milliseconds; additionally, the unit brings the ability to shift in a non-sequential manner – going from gear 8 to gear 2 in extreme situations.

Future development will see two four-wheel drive versions available, with a version destined for Volkswagen Group applications using a Torsen centre differential.

Chrysler Group LLC initially received the 8HP from the ZF plant in Saarbrücken.  By 2013, in parallel with Chrysler Group, ZF had set up a new transmission production plant in Gray Court, South Carolina. ZF Friedrichshafen and Chrysler Group have reached a supply and licence agreement for the 8HP.  Chrysler Group is licensed to produce the 8HP at the company's Kokomo Transmission Plant and the Kokomo Casting plant, production began in 2013. This transmission is marketed by Chrysler under their own brand name, the Torqueflite 8.

2nd generation 8HP products were released starting in 2014.  Efficiency improvements over the original design include a wider ratio spread of 7.8:1, reduced drag torque from the shift elements, reduction in required oil pump pressure, and broadened use of the coasting and start-stop systems. ZF estimated fuel economy improvement over 1st generation 8HP kits to be 3%.  Refinements were also made with respect to vibration.

3rd generation 8HP products were released starting in 2018. Major improvements are total spread of 8.6 and a fuel economy improvement of 2.5% compared to the 2nd generation. There are several options in maximum torque available, also the gearbox is available with mild hybrid and plug in hybrid options: With 15 kW and 200 NM supporting boosting and recuperation in combination with 48 Volt technology up to 90 kW and 250 NM for usage with higher voltage.

Specifications

Preliminary note
Below is a table of reference gear ratios as provided with the ZF 8HP transmission, though actual implementations may differ depending on the tuning and specifications of individual vehicle manufacturers such as BMW and Audi. Differences in gear ratios have a measurable, direct impact on vehicle dynamics, performance, waste emissions as well as fuel mileage.

Technical data

List of ZF 8HP variants

Applications

Alfa Romeo 
Alfa Romeo Giulia
Alfa Romeo Stelvio

Alpina 
 Alpina D3 (F30/F31)
 Alpina D3 (G20/G21)
 Alpina D4 (F32/F33)
 Alpina B3 (F30/F31)
 Alpina B3 (G20/G21)
 Alpina B4 (F32/F33)
 Alpina XD3
 Alpina XD4
 Alpina D5 (G30/G31)
 Alpina B5 (G30/G31)
 Alpina B6
 Alpina B7
 Alpina B8 
 Alpina XB7

Aston Martin 
Aston Martin Vanquish 2015–2018
Aston Martin Rapide 2014–2020
Aston Martin Vantage (2018)
Aston Martin DB11
Aston Martin DBS Superleggera

Audi 
Audi S4 North American version
Audi S5 North American version
2011+ Audi A4 North American B8/8.5 Quattro Versions
2011+ Audi A5  North American B8/8.5 Quattro Versions
Audi A6
Audi A7
Audi RS6
Audi RS7
Audi A8
Audi Q5 8AT version''
2017+ Audi Q7/SQ7
2018+ Audi Q8/SQ8/RSQ8

Bentley 
Bentley Mulsanne (2010)
Bentley Continental GT 2011–2018
Bentley Flying Spur (2013) 2014–2019
Bentley Bentayga

BMW 
BMW 1 Series (F20)
2014+ BMW 2 Series (F22/F23, G42)
2012+ BMW 3 Series
2014+ BMW 4 Series
2010+ BMW 5 Series
BMW 5 GT
BMW 6 Series
BMW 7 series
BMW 8 Series
BMW X1 (First Generation)
BMW X3
BMW X4
BMW X5
BMW X6
BMW X7
BMW Z4

Chrysler 
Chrysler 300 (2012+ MY), V8 (2015+ MY)
 3.6L Pentastar V6 (845RE)
 5.7L HEMI V8 (8HP70)

Dodge 
Dodge Challenger (2015+ MY)
 3.6 Pentastar V6 (845RE)
 5.7, 6.4 HEMI V8 (8HP70)
 6.2L HEMI Supercharged V8 (8HP90)
Dodge Charger 
 3.6L Pentastar V6, 2012+ MY, 845RE 
 HEMI V8 (2015+ MY; 5.7L, 6.4L 8HP70; 6.2L Supercharged 8HP90)
Dodge Durango(2014 MY+)
 3.6L Pentastar V6 (845RE 2014–2017, 850RE 2018–)
 5.7, 6.4 HEMI V8 (8HP70)
 6.2L HEMI Supercharged V8 (8HP95)

Great Wall Motors
Pao (2019–present)
TANK 300 (2020–present)

Haval
H8 (2017–2018)
H9 (2017–)

INEOS Automotive
 Ineos Grenadier

Iveco
Iveco Daily 2014-on

Jaguar 
 F-Type
 F-Pace
 XE
 XF (2013–2015)
 XF (2016–)
 XFR (2013–2015)
 XFR-S (2013–2015)
 XJ (X351) 2013–2019

Jeep
Jeep Grand Cherokee (WK2) (2014 MY-2022 MY)
 3.6L Pentastar V6 (845RE 2014–2016, 850RE 2017–2022)
 3.0L EcoDiesel V6 (8HP70 2014–2016, 8HP75 2017–2021)
 5.7L, 6.4L HEMI V8 (8HP70)
 6.2L HEMI Supercharged V8 (8HP95)
Jeep Grand Cherokee (WL)
Jeep Grand Cherokee 2022–
Jeep Grand Cherokee L 2021–
Jeep Wrangler/Unlimited (JL) (2018 MY+) 
 2.0L Hurricane (Turbocharged) I4 (850RE)
 3.6L Pentastar V6 (850RE)
 3.0L EcoDiesel V6 (8HP75 2020–)
 6.4L Hemi 392 V8 (8HP75 2021–)
Jeep Gladiator (JT) (2020 MY+)
 3.6L Pentastar V6 (850RE)
 3.0L EcoDiesel V6 (8HP75)
Jeep Wagoneer/Grand Wagoneer (WS) (2022 MY+)

JMC
 JMC Vigus

Lamborghini
 Lamborghini Urus

Lancia 
Thema V6

Land Rover 
 Discovery 4/LR4
 Discovery (L462)
 Range Rover (L322) 2011–2012 TDV8 only
 Range Rover (L405)
 Range Rover (L460)
 Range Rover Sport (L320) 2012–2013 SDV6 only
 Range Rover Sport (L494) 
Range Rover Velar
 Defender (L663)

MAN
MAN TGE (2017+) (longitudinally mounted engine only)

Maserati
Maserati Ghibli III
Maserati Quattroporte
Maserati Levante
Maserati Grecale

Morgan
Plus Six
Plus Four

Porsche
Cayenne (2018–present)

Ram Trucks
Ram 1500 3.6L Pentastar V6 (2013 MY+) 
Ram 1500 3.0L EcoDiesel V6 (2014 MY+)
Ram 1500 5.7L HEMI V8 (2013 MY+)
Ram 2500/3500 6.4L HEMI V8 (2019 MY+)
Ram 1500 TRX 6.2L HEMI Supercharged V8 (2021 MY+)

Rolls-Royce 
Rolls-Royce Ghost
Rolls-Royce Phantom VII
Rolls-Royce Wraith (2013)
Rolls-Royce Dawn
Rolls-Royce Phantom VIII
Rolls-Royce Cullinan

Toyota 
Toyota Supra 5th generation

VinFast 
VinFast LUX A2.0
VinFast LUX SA2.0

Volkswagen 
Volkswagen Amarok
Volkswagen Crafter (2017+) (longitudinally mounted engine only)
Volkswagen Touareg (3rd generation)

See also
List of Chrysler transmissions
List of ZF transmissions

References

External links
 

8HP